Touch Sunnix or "Touch Sreynich, Touch Sunnich" (Khmer: ទូច ស៊ុននិច; born in 1980) is a singer from Phnom Penh, Cambodia.
She began singing at an early age. Her work embodies key themes in Cambodian culture such as folk stories, traditional Cambodian dancing, freedom of expression and democracy in the lyrics of her songs.

2003 shooting 

In October 2003, Touch Sunnix survived an attempted assassination. Touch Sunnix lost her mother in the 2003 attack. They were shot by four men on motorcycles after a shopping trip in Phnom Penh. She sustained heavy injury and is currently paralyzed from the neck down from the assault. The assault to Touch Sunnix is still unsolved. The Cambodian king, Norodom Sihanouk, has expressed his deep sadness at the attack on the singer, who had on occasion entertained his royal guests.

After her attempted assassination, Touch Sunnix requested that her fans pray for her quick recovery.

Discography 

The following is a list of songs made by the artist in alphabetical order in English and Khmer.

A 
 Awve Oun Dak Levknoung – អាវអូនដាក់ឡេវខ្នង

C 
 Chamreang Lork Pka – ចម្រៀងលក់ផ្កា
 Chet Aprei – ចិត្តអប្រីយ៏
 Cheth Klach Cheth – ចិត្តខ្លាចចិត្ត (Duet with Bayarith)
 Chnam Oun Dob Brahm Mouy – ឆ្នាំអូន ១៦
 Chompey Sor – ចំប៉ីស (Duet with Song Veacha)

D 
 Deumtreanig Youl – ដើមត្រែងយោល – (Duet with Veaja)

K 
 Kansein Hout Cheiy –  កន្សែងហូតជាយ (Duet with Veaja)
 kjnom Chmjos Chey Chet – _ខ្ញុំឈ្មោះជ័យជេត (Duet with Pha Sophat)
 Klenpka Krawpoum – ក្លិនផ្កាក្រពុំ
 Komplich Bopha Angkor – កុំភ្លេចបុប្ផាអង្គរ (Duet with Dara Chlangdane)
 Komponglourng Doung Chet – កំពង់លួងដួងចិត្ត
 Krawmom Teing Klourn – ក្រមុំតែងខ្លួន

M 
 Mel Awei Mles – មើលអ្វីម្លេះ

P 
 Piano Bak Ktong – ព្យាណូបាក់ខ្ទង់
 Preah Kun Madai – ព្រះគុណម្ត឵យ 
 Prathna Kroub Cheat – បា្រថ្នាគ្រប់ជាតិ (Duet with Veaja)
 Ptas Pet – ផ្ទះប៉ិត
 Pi Chhnam Jam Snae - ពីរឆ្នាំចាំស្នេហ៍
Pror Lorm Snaeh - ប្រលោមស្នេហ៍

R 
 Reatrey Tee muoy –  រាត្រីទីមួយ
 Robam Neary Chea Chour – របាំនារីជាជួរ 
 Robam Tep Apsara – របាំទេព្វអប្សរា
 Romvong Psaun Rork Kou – រាំវង់ផ្សងរកគូ
 Roop Oun Min La-or – រូបអុនមិនល្អ

S 
 Sarika Keo Keurth – សារិកាកែវកើត ( Duet with Noy Vanneth)
 Sdach Domrey Sor – ដេចដំរីស (Duet with Song Veacha)
 Som Herk Khor Klei – សុំហែកខោខ្លី
 Somleng Kane – សមេ្លងគែន (Duet with Phanin)
 Srah Muy Keo – ស្រាមួយកែវ
 Srawnos Mlob Doung – ស្រណោះម្លប់ដូង

T 
 Tlaung Tha Min Tlaung – ថ្លង់ថាមិនថ្លង់
 Thngai Sa Ek Ka Borng - ថ្ងៃស្អែកការបង
 Tumnuonh Pka Ankeabos - ទំនួញផ្កាអង្គារបុស្ស(រង់ចាំសន្យា)

V 
 Veasna Kolab Kampuchea

Filmography 
Her work can also be found on many Cambodian karaoke DVDs.

See also

 Kong Bunchhoeun
 Pisith Pilika
 Tat Marina

References

21st-century Cambodian women singers
1980 births
Living people
Shooting survivors
People from Phnom Penh